
Year 222 (CCXXII) was a common year starting on Tuesday (link will display the full calendar) of the Julian calendar. In the Roman Empire, it was known as the Year of the Consulship of Antoninus and Severus (or, less frequently, year 975 Ab urbe condita). The denomination 222 for this year has been used since the early medieval period, when the Anno Domini calendar era became the prevalent method in Europe for naming years.

Events 
 By place 

 Roman Empire 
 March 11 – Emperor Elagabalus is assassinated, along with his mother, Julia Soaemias, by the Praetorian Guard during a revolt. Their mutilated bodies are dragged through the streets of Rome before being thrown into the Tiber.
 Alexander Severus succeeds Elagabalus. He is only 13 years old; his mother, Julia Avita Mamaea, governs the Roman Empire with the help of Domitius Ulpianus and a council composed of 16 senators.

 China 
 Battle of Xiaoting/Yiling: The Chinese state of Shu Han is defeated by Eastern Wu.

 By topic 

 Commerce 
 The silver content of the Roman denarius falls to 35 percent under emperor Alexander Severus, down from 43 percent under Elagabalus.

 Religion 
 October 14 – Pope Callixtus I is killed by a mob in Rome's Trastevere after a 5-year reign in which he has stabilized the Saturday fast three times per year, with no food, oil, or wine to be consumed on those days. Callixtus is succeeded by Cardinal Urban I.

Births 
 Marcus Aurelius Carus, Roman emperor (d. 283)
 Du Yu (or Yuankai), Chinese general and politician (d. 285)

Deaths 
 March 11 
 Elagabalus, Roman emperor (b. 203)
 Julia Soaemias, mother of Elagabalus (b. 180)
 Annia Faustina, Roman noblewoman and empress
 Bardaisan, Syriac scholar and philosopher (b. 154)
 Callixtus I, pope of the Catholic Church 
 Cheng Ji (or Jiran), Chinese general 
 Feng Xi (or Xiuyuan), Chinese general
 Hierocles, favourite and lover of Elagabalus
 Liu Ba (or Zichu), Chinese official and politician
 Ma Chao, Chinese general and warlord (b. 176)
 Ma Liang, Chinese diplomat and politician (b. 187)
 Xu Jing (or Wenxiu), Chinese official and politician
 Zhang Liao (or Wenyuan), Chinese general (b. 169)

References